The St. Lawrence Island famine killed around 1000 people on St. Lawrence Island in the Bering Sea off the Alaskan mainland during the years 1878–1880. Possible causes may have been overfishing, disease, or negative aspects of settler contact.

Background
In the late 19th century there were about 4,000 Central Alaskan Yupik and Siberian Yupik living in several villages on St. Lawrence Island. They subsisted by hunting walrus and whale and by fishing in the Bering Sea. A famine during the years 1878–1880 caused many to starve and many others to leave, drastically reducing the island's population. The revenue cutter USRC Thomas Corwin visited the island in 1880. After visiting multiple villages, the Thomas Corwin's crew estimated that out of 1500 remaining inhabitants, 1000 were found dead of starvation.

Survivors told of strange weather that prevented hunting and fishing in the ocean. News reports of the time put the blame on traders supplying the people with liquor, causing them to "neglect laying up their usual supply of provisions". Nearly all the remaining residents were Siberian Yupik. Other contributing factors were the excessive depletion and overfishing of ocean life, and the introduction of communicable diseases such as dysentery, measles, black tongue (anemia), scarlet fever, and vitaminosis.

Many villages on the island were totally depopulated by the famine. One such village, Kukulik, was abandoned and was totally destroyed by the elements. Other populations of the area experienced similar food shortages.

Aftermath
Reindeer were introduced on the island on July 23, 1900, by Presbyterian missionary Sheldon Jackson in an attempt to prevent starvation and improve the Native Alaskans' "plight". The reindeer herd grew to about 10,000 animals by 1917 but has since declined. Reindeer are herded as a source of subsistence meat to this day.

President Theodore Roosevelt established a reindeer reserve on the island in 1903. This caused legal issues in the indigenous land claim process to acquire surface and subsurface rights to their land under the section 19 of Alaska Native Claims Settlement Act (ANCSA), as they had to prove that the reindeer reserve was set up to support the indigenous people rather than to protect the reindeer themselves.

See also
1950 Canadian caribou famine

Bibliography
Notes

References 
 - Total pages: 495 
 - Total pages: 520 
 

 - Total pages: 330 

 
 - Total pages: 416 

United States
1878 in Alaska
1879 in Alaska
1880 in Alaska
19th-century famines